The Belgrano River is a river in Argentina.

See also
List of rivers of Argentina

References
 Rand McNally, The New International Atlas, 1993.
  GEOnet Names Server 

Rivers of Argentina
Rivers of Santa Cruz Province, Argentina